Skagit Regional Airport  is a public airport located three miles (5 km) west of the central business district of Burlington and northwest of Mount Vernon, both cities in Skagit County, Washington, United States. The airport is owned by the Port of Skagit County. It is situated in the Bayview Industrial Park.

Although most U.S. airports use the same three-letter location identifier for the FAA and IATA, Skagit Regional Airport is assigned BVS by the FAA and MVW by the IATA (which assigned BVS to Breves, Pará, Brazil).

Facilities and aircraft 

For the 12-month period ending October 31, 2006, the airport had 58,100 aircraft operations, an average of 159 per day: 96% general aviation, 3% air taxi and <1% military. At that time there were 151 aircraft based at this airport: 91% single engine, 2% multi-engine, 7% jet aircraft and 1% ultralights.

In the 1980s, Harbor Airlines operated commercial passenger flights into and out of MVW to Seattle-Tacoma International and to Oak Harbor, WA, using Britten-Norman Islander aircraft.

The Heritage Flight Museum is located on the south side of the airport.

Cargo Carriers

References

External links 
  at Port of Skagit County Website Page
  Facebook Page
 Skagit Regional (Bayview) Airport at Washington State DOT

Airports in Washington (state)
Burlington, Washington
Transportation buildings and structures in Skagit County, Washington